Andrew Vincent Corry (September 22, 1904, Missoula, Montana - November 24, 1981 San Diego, California) was a career foreign service officer who was the US Ambassador to Sierra Leone from 1964 until 1967.  He then immediately served, concurrently, as US Ambassador to Sri Lanka and the Maldives, until 1970.

Education
Andrew Vincent Corry was born on September 22, 1904 in Missoula, Montana, the son of Arthur Vincent Corry (Snr) (1874-1945) and Mary Anne née Armstrong (1877-1958).
 
Corry graduated from Carroll High School in Helena, Montana in 1922. From 1922 – 1924, he studied at Carroll College (also in Helena) before graduating with an A.B. from Harvard.  He studied at Merton College, Oxford, from 1927 to 1930 (A.B. 1929, B.Sc. 1930) as a Rhodes Scholar returning to Montana to earn a M.S. in 1931 from the Montana School of Mines in Butte.

Career
Corry joined the Foreign Service in January 1947 as Special Assistant to the Director in the Office of American Republic Affairs.  In August that year he was assigned to be Mineral Attaché to New Delhi with concurrent assignments, in the same capacity, to Colombo, Karachi, Rangoon and Kathmandu.  From 1955 to 1957 he was the Deputy Director of the US Operations Mission, as well as the Economic Officer at the American Embassy in Madrid. He then worked as the Consul General in Lahore, Pakistan and as the Coordinator of the Senior Seminar in Foreign Policy at the Foreign Service Institute. On January 24, 1964 he was appointed as the US envoy to Sierra Leone and remained at that post until May 19, 1967, where he was subsequently appointed on May 24 as the ambassador to Sri Lanka and the Maldives. He retained that post until he retired on March 21, 1970.

Corry died of emphysema on November 24, 1981 in San Diego, California and was buried at Saint Patricks Cemetery in Butte, Montana.

References

1904 births
1981 deaths
Burials in Montana
Carroll College (Montana) alumni
Harvard University alumni
Ambassadors of the United States to Sri Lanka
Ambassadors of the United States to the Maldives
Ambassadors of the United States to Sierra Leone
Montana Technological University alumni
American Rhodes Scholars
Alumni of the University of Oxford
People from Missoula, Montana
Deaths from emphysema
Alumni of Merton College, Oxford
20th-century American diplomats